Directorate of Underground Resistance (KWP) was an agency of the Polish Underground State created during World War II.

History
The Directorate of Underground Resistance was created in 1943 from the Directorate of Civil Resistance and the Directorate of Covert Resistance. It carried out tasks previously reserved for the two directorates.

The KWP was commanded collectively by the commander of the Home Army, its chief of staff, the commander of the KeDyw, the chief of the Bureau of Information and Propaganda, and a representative of the Government Delegation for Poland.

References 

Polish Underground State
Poland in World War II